Prášily is a municipality and village in Klatovy District in the Plzeň Region of the Czech Republic. It has about 100 inhabitants.

Administrative parts
The village of Nová Hůrka is an administrative part of Prášily.

Geography
It lies in the Bohemian Forest.

With the area of 112.33 km2 it is the largest municipality in the country without the town status by size, even though most of Prášily's territory is covered by forests.

Notable people
Gunther of Bohemia (c. 955–1045), Catholic hermit and diplomat; died in the hermitage on Březník mountain

Gallery

References

External links

Villages in Klatovy District
Bohemian Forest